Ove Krogh Rants (born 14 August 1926) is a Danish cyclist. He competed in the men's sprint event at the 1952 Summer Olympics.

References

External links
 

1926 births
Living people
Danish male cyclists
Olympic cyclists of Denmark
Cyclists at the 1952 Summer Olympics
Cyclists from Copenhagen